Sikkim Himali Rajya Parishad (translation: Sikkim Himalayan State Association),  was a political party in the Indian state of Sikkim. The party president was Dr. A.D. Subba. Tara Shrestha was the general secretary of the party.

In February 2004 SHRP together with Indian National Congress, Bharatiya Janata Party, Communist Party of India (Marxist),  Organization of Sikkimese Unity (OSU), Sikkim Gorkha Party (SGP), Sikkim Gorkha Prajatantrik Party (SGPP), Sikkim National Liberation Front (SNLF), Nepali Bhutia Lepcha (NEBULA),  and Gorkha National Liberation Front  as a joint political front.

In the 2004 parliamentary election SHRP contested the sole Lok Sabha seat in Sikkim. The party candidate, Tara Kumar Pradhan, came fourth with 2765 votes (1.26%).

In 2008, the party spoke out against a proposal to merge Sikkim with Darjeeling.

In 2014, SHRP merged with Indian National Congress.

References

Political parties in Sikkim
Political parties with year of establishment missing
2014 disestablishments in India
Political parties disestablished in 2014